Warburg is a city in Germany.

Warburg may also refer to:

Businesses and organizations
M. M. Warburg & Co., German investment bank, founded 1798
S. G. Warburg & Co., British investment bank, merged into Warburg Dillon Read
UBS Warburg, a Swiss multinational investment bank and financial services company
Warburg Institute, founded by Aby Warburg
Warburg Pincus, a private equity firm, founded by Eric Warburg

People 
Warburg family
Aby Warburg (1866–1929), German art historian, founder of the Warburg Institute
Mary Warburg (artist) (1866–1934), German artist, wife of Aby Warburg
Gerson Warburg (1765-1826), Hamburg banker
Max Warburg (1867–1946), Hamburg banker
Moses Marcus Warburg (1763-1830), Hamburg banker, founder of M. M. Warburg & Co., Hamburg
Paul Warburg (1868–1932), German-born American investment banker, former Federal Reserve Vice Chairman and one of the fathers of the Federal Reserve System
Felix M. Warburg (1871–1937), New York banker
Frieda Schiff Warburg (1867–1958), philanthropist
James Warburg (1896–1969), American banker, financial adviser to Franklin D. Roosevelt
Frederick M. Warburg (1897–1973), New York banker
Eric M. Warburg (1900–1990), banker and goodwill ambassador, namesake of the Eric M. Warburg Prize
Bettina Warburg (1900–1990), psychiatrist
Siegmund George Warburg (1902–1982), founder of S. G. Warburg & Co., London
Paul F. Warburg (1904–1965), American banker
Edward Warburg (1908–1992), American philanthropist
the German Warburg family
Emil Warburg (1846–1931), physicist
Otto Warburg (botanist) (1859–1938), German-Jewish botanist
Otto Heinrich Warburg (1883–1970), physiologist, winner of the 1931 Nobel Prize in Physiology or Medicine

Other people 

Carl Warburg (c. 1805–1892), German physician and scientist
Eugene Warburg (1825—1859), African-American sculptor
Agnes Warburg (1872–1953), British photographer
Sydney Warburg (1880–1947), the pen name of an anonymous author who published a book about funding of the Nazi Party by American bankers
Fredric Warburg (1898–1981), publisher, founder of Secker and Warburg
E. F. Warburg (1908–1966), English botanist
Mary Warburg (1908–2009), American philanthropist
Margit Warburg (born 1952), Danish sociologist of religion
Sam Warburg (born 1983), American tennis player
Kai von Warburg (born 1968), German lightweight rower
Otto Warburg (disambiguation)

Places 
Warburg, Alberta, village in Canada
Kfar Warburg, village in Israel
Sde Warburg, village in Israel
Warburg Nature Reserve, in Oxfordshire, England

Science and medicine
Anderson-Warburg syndrome or Norrie disease, a genetic disorder that primarily affects the eye
Warburg coefficient, the diffusion coefficient of ions in solution
Warburg effect (oncology), a hypothesis of cancer growth
Warburg effect (plant physiology), the decrease in the rate of photosynthesis caused by high oxygen concentrations
Warburg element
Warburg hypothesis, a hypothesis of cancer growth
Warburg Sjo Fledelius Syndrome or Micro syndrome, a rare autosomal recessive genetic disorder
Warburg syndrome, a rare form of autosomal recessive congenital muscular dystrophy
Warburg's tincture, pharmaceutical drug invented in 1834 by Dr Carl Warburg

Other 
Battle of Warburg (31 July 1760), during the Seven Years' War

See also
Warberg, Germany
Wartburg (disambiguation)
Warburg effect (disambiguation)